The 2006–07 season saw Macclesfield Town compete in Football League Two where they finished in 22nd position with 48 points.

Final league table

AR Deducted 10 points for voluntary arrangements.

Results
Macclesfield Town's score comes first

Legend

Football League Two

Results summary

Results by matchday

FA Cup

Football League Cup

Football League Trophy

Squad statistics

References

External links
 Macclesfield Town 2006–07 at Soccerbase.com (select relevant season from dropdown list)

Macclesfield Town F.C. seasons
Macclesfield Town